In physics, chemistry and related fields, master equations are used to describe the time evolution of a system that can be modelled as being in a probabilistic combination of states at any given time and the switching between states is determined by a transition rate matrix. The equations are a set of differential equations – over time – of the probabilities that the system occupies each of the different states.

Introduction
A master equation is a phenomenological set of first-order differential equations describing the time evolution of (usually) the probability of a system to occupy each one of a discrete set of states with regard to a continuous time variable t. The most familiar form of a master equation is a matrix form:

The way connections among states are made determines the dimension of the problem; it is either
a d-dimensional system (where d is 1,2,3,...), where any state is connected with exactly its 2d nearest neighbors, or
a network, where every pair of states may have a connection (depending on the network's properties).

When the connections are time-independent rate constants, the master equation represents a kinetic scheme, and the process is Markovian (any jumping time probability density function for state i is an exponential, with a rate equal to the value of the connection). When the connections depend on the actual time (i.e. matrix  depends on the time), the process is not stationary and the master equation reads

When the connections represent multi exponential jumping time probability density functions, the process is semi-Markovian, and the equation of motion is an integro-differential equation termed the generalized master equation:

The matrix  can also represent birth and death, meaning that probability is injected (birth) or taken from (death) the system, where then, the process is not in equilibrium.

Detailed description of the matrix and properties of the system
Let  be the matrix describing the transition rates (also known as kinetic rates or reaction rates). As always, the first subscript represents the row, the second subscript the column. That is, the source is given by the second subscript, and the destination by the first subscript. This is the opposite of what one might expect, but it is technically convenient.

For each state k, the increase in occupation probability depends on the contribution from all other states to k, and is given by:

where  is the probability for the system to be in the state , while the matrix  is filled with a grid of transition-rate constants.  Similarly,  contributes to the occupation of all other states 

In probability theory, this identifies the evolution as a continuous-time Markov process, with the integrated master equation obeying a Chapman–Kolmogorov equation.

The master equation can be simplified so that the terms with ℓ = k do not appear in the summation.

The final equality arises from the fact that 
 
because the summation over the probabilities  yields one, a constant function. Since this has to hold for any probability  (and in particular for any probability of the form  for some k) we get
 
Using this we can write the diagonal elements as
.

These symmetry relations were proved on the basis of the time reversibility of  microscopic dynamics (microscopic reversibility) as Onsager reciprocal relations.

Examples of master equations
Many physical problems in classical, quantum mechanics and problems in other sciences, can be reduced to the form of a master equation, thereby performing a great simplification of the problem (see mathematical model).

The Lindblad equation in quantum mechanics is a generalization of the master equation describing the time evolution of a density matrix.  Though the Lindblad equation is often referred to as a master equation, it is not one in the usual sense, as it governs not only the time evolution of probabilities (diagonal elements of the density matrix), but also of variables containing information about quantum coherence between the states of the system (non-diagonal elements of the density matrix).

Another special case of the master equation is the Fokker–Planck equation which describes the time evolution of a continuous probability distribution. Complicated master equations which resist analytic treatment can be cast into this form (under various approximations), by using approximation techniques such as the system size expansion.

Stochastic chemical kinetics are yet another example of the Master equation. A chemical Master equation is used to model a set of chemical reactions when the number of molecules of one or more species is small (of the order of 100 or 1000 molecules). The chemical Master equations is also solved for the very large models such as DNA damage signal, Fungal pathogen candida albicans for the first time.

Quantum master equations 

A quantum master equation is a generalization of the idea of a master equation. Rather than just a system of differential equations for a set of probabilities (which only constitutes the diagonal elements of a density matrix), quantum master equations are differential equations for the entire density matrix, including off-diagonal elements. A density matrix with only diagonal elements can be modeled as a classical random process, therefore such an "ordinary" master equation is considered classical. Off-diagonal elements represent quantum coherence which is a physical characteristic that is intrinsically quantum mechanical.

The Redfield equation and Lindblad equation are examples of approximate quantum master equations assumed to be Markovian. More accurate quantum master equations for certain applications include the polaron transformed quantum master equation, and the VPQME (variational polaron transformed quantum master equation).

Theorem about eigenvalues of the matrix and time evolution 
Because  fulfills

and 
 
one can show that: 
 All other eigenvalues  fulfill .
 All eigenvectors  with a non-zero eigenvalue fulfill .

This has important consequences for the time evolution of a state.

See also
 Kolmogorov equations (Markov jump process)
 Continuous-time Markov process
 Quantum master equation
 Fermi's golden rule
 Detailed balance
 Boltzmann's H-theorem

References

External links
 Timothy Jones, A Quantum Optics Derivation (2006)

Statistical mechanics
Stochastic calculus
Equations
Equations of physics